STE20/SPS1-related proline-alanine-rich protein kinase is an enzyme that in humans is encoded by the STK39 gene.

This gene encodes a serine/threonine kinase that is thought to function in the cellular stress response pathway. The kinase is activated in response to hypotonic stress, leading to phosphorylation of several cation-chloride-coupled cotransporters. The catalytically active kinase specifically activates the p38 MAP kinase pathway, and its interaction with p38 decreases upon cellular stress, suggesting that this kinase may serve as an intermediate in the response to cellular stress.
Some studies suggest that this gene might be linked to high blood pressure.

References

Further reading